Kumbli is a  uninhabited islet in the Gulf of Finland, near Tallinn, Estonia. Administratively Kumbli belongs to the Rohuneeme village in Viimsi Parish, Harju County.

On a map from 1689 the islet is marked as Komblesahr, which may refer to Estonian origin.

In 2012 there was only one Scots pine and little shrubs covering the islet.

There are no construction rights on the islet. Kumbli belongs to a local businessman Aivar Osa.

See also
List of islands of Estonia

References

Uninhabited islands of Estonia
Viimsi Parish
Estonian islands in the Baltic